Love and Duty is a 1722 tragedy by the British writer John Sturmy.

The original Lincoln's Inn Fields cast included Anthony Boheme as Danaus James Quin as Lynceus, Richard Diggs as Arcas, John Egleton as Idas and Anna Maria Seymour as Hypermnestra and Jane Egleton as Iris. It lasted for six performances on its initial run.

References

Bibliography
 Burling, William J. A Checklist of New Plays and Entertainments on the London Stage, 1700-1737. Fairleigh Dickinson Univ Press, 1992.
 Nicoll, Allardyce. A History of Early Eighteenth Century Drama: 1700-1750. CUP Archive, 1927.

1722 plays
British plays
West End plays
Tragedy plays
Historical plays
Plays set in ancient Greece